Mocha is a city located in the central Andean mountain range of Ecuador. Located in Tungurahua Province, Mocha is the seat of the Mocha Canton. The current mayor of Mocha is Sr. Orlando Caluña.

References

Populated places in Tungurahua Province